Una usta, the una, is a small butterfly found in India and South-East Asia that belongs to the lycaenids or blues family.

See also
List of butterflies of India (Lycaenidae)

References
 
  
 
 
 
 

Polyommatini
Butterflies of Asia